Illa del Mar ("Sea Island") is a complex of four buildings, including two skyscrapers, located in Barcelona, Catalonia, Spain. The tallest skyscrapers is Illa del Mar 1 with 99 meters (325 feet) tall and has 29 floors and Illa del Mar 2 with 77 meters tall and has 23 floors. The Illa del Mar complex is located in the district of Sant Martí on Passeig del Taulat street.

See also 

 List of tallest buildings and structures in Barcelona

External links 
 Additional information about Illa del Mar - plataformaarquitectura.cl
 Espais Promocions Immobiliaries

References 

Skyscrapers in Barcelona
Residential skyscrapers in Spain
Buildings and structures completed in 2007
Retail buildings in Spain